The Spain women's national cricket team represents the country of Spain in women's cricket matches.

In April 2018, the International Cricket Council (ICC) granted full Women's Twenty20 International (WT20I) status to all its members. Therefore, all Twenty20 matches played by between Espaniol women and another international sides after 1 July 2018 will be a full WT20I. The team played their first official WT20I matches during a quadrangular series in France in May 2022.

Records and statistics
International Match Summary — Spain Women

Last updated 14 November 2022

Twenty20 International 

T20I record versus other nations

Records complete to WT20I #1302. Last updated 14 November 2022.

See also
 List of Spain women Twenty20 International cricketers

References

External links
Spain's women cricket team

Women's
Women's national cricket teams
Cricket